Florin Ionuț Croitoru (born 25 August 1993) is a Romanian weightlifter who competed at the 2012 Summer Olympics in the Men's 56 kg. He finished fourth place at the 2013 European Championships, but later he won gold, after all three medalists (Valentin Hristov, Igor Bour, Zulfugar Suleymanov) were suspended for doping.

In May 2019 he was disqualified from the 2012 Summer Olympics after the re-analysis of his samples. Croitoru tested positive for dehydrochlormethyltestosterone, metenolone and stanozolol.

References

External links
 
 
 
 

1993 births
Living people
Romanian male weightlifters
Olympic weightlifters of Romania
Weightlifters at the 2012 Summer Olympics
Weightlifters at the 2010 Summer Youth Olympics
Romanian sportspeople in doping cases
Doping cases in weightlifting
European Weightlifting Championships medalists
21st-century Romanian people